Azurian Attack is a fixed shooter released in arcades by New Zealand-based Rait Electronics in 1982. The game features similar graphics and sounds to Galaxian, except the player-controlled fighter can move in eight directions.  The game was programmed in-house by Rait Electronics who were based in Christchurch, New Zealand. It uses a modified Galaxian board.

External links
Azurian Attack at Arcade History

1982 video games
Arcade video games
Arcade-only video games
Fixed shooters
Video games developed in New Zealand